The Gras House, at 616 W. Elias in Rock Springs, Wyoming, is a Bungalow/craftsman house that was built in 1913–14.  Also known as the Boucvalt—Gras House, it was listed on the National Register of Historic Places in 1986.

It is significant as one of the earliest bungalow houses built in Rock Springs, of architecture that evolved and suited what was a "growing and
solid middle class."

References

External links
 Gras House at the Wyoming State Historic Preservation Office

Houses on the National Register of Historic Places in Wyoming
Houses completed in 1914
Buildings and structures in Rock Springs, Wyoming
Houses in Sweetwater County, Wyoming
National Register of Historic Places in Sweetwater County, Wyoming